Shchukozerye is a rural locality (a selo) in Obozerskoye Urban Settlement of Plesetsky District, Arkhangelsk Oblast, Russia. The population was 4 as of 2010.

Geography 
Shchukozerye is located 127 km north of Plesetsk (the district's administrative centre) by road. Malye Ozerki is the nearest rural locality.

References 

Rural localities in Plesetsky District